The 1973 World Table Tennis Championships – Swaythling Cup (men's team) was the 32nd edition of the men's team championship.  

Sweden won the gold medal by virtue of winning the final group. Despite losing one of the matches against the Soviet Union they topped the group with a superior match record. China took silver and Japan bronze.

Medalists

Swaythling Cup tables

Group A

Group B

Final group

Final group

See also
List of World Table Tennis Championships medalists

References

-